The Peugeot 908 RC was a concept car that was produced by the French car manufacturer Peugeot, and was first shown to the public at the 2006 Paris Motor Show. The first official pictures of the 908 RC were released in August 2006.

The 908 RC was fitted with a six-speed sequential gearbox, with power to the rear wheels.

The suspension was front and rear drop link with double wishbone suspension, while the brakes were carbon ceramic discs, made by Brembo.

Gallery

References

908 RC
Rear mid-engine, rear-wheel-drive vehicles